Hec Oakley (10 January 1909 – 19 December 1998) was an Australian cricketer. He played 28 first-class cricket matches for Victoria between 1930 and 1939. He played for St. Kilda in Victorian district cricket from 1929 to 1948.

See also
 List of Victoria first-class cricketers

References

External links
 

1909 births
1998 deaths
Australian cricketers
Victoria cricketers
Cricketers from Melbourne